Nisa (also Parthaunisa) was an ancient settlement of the Parthians, located near the Bagyr neighborhood of Ashgabat, Turkmenistan, 18 km west of the city center. Nisa is described by some as the first seat of the Arsacid Empire. It is traditionally assumed to have been founded by Arsaces I (reigned c. 250 BC–211 BC) and was reputedly the royal residence of the Parthian kings, although it has not been established that the fortress at Nisa was either a royal residence or a mausoleum.

In 2007, the fortress was declared a World Heritage Site by UNESCO.

History
Nisa was a major trading hub in the Parthian Empire. Nisa was later renamed Mithradātkert by Mithridates I of Parthia (reigned c. 171 BC–138 BC). The region was famous for the fast and beautiful horses.

Nisa was totally destroyed by an earthquake during the 1st decade BC.

Excavations
Excavations at Nisa have revealed substantial buildings, mausoleums and shrines, many inscribed documents, and a looted treasury. Many Hellenistic art works have been uncovered, as well as a large number of ivory rhytons, and rims (coins) decorated with Iranian subjects or classical mythological scenes.

Gallery

See also

 History of Turkmenistan
 List of World Heritage Sites in Turkmenistan
Elena Abramovna Davidovich

References

Bibliography

Sorted by year then author (see Italian Archaeological Mission in Old Nisa):
Bibliography. Publications of Centro Scavi di Torino and contributions of the members of the Italian Expeditions to Nisa. Retrieved: 30 August 2009.</ref>
MASSON M.E., PUGACHENKOVA G.A., The Parthians rhytons of Nisa, Monografie di Mesopotamia (Introduction by A. Invernizzi), Firenze, Le Lettere. 1982
Invernizzi A., KOSHELENKO G.A., «Soviet-Italian Excavations in Old Nisa (Season 1990) », Mesopotamia, XXV, pp. 47–50. 1990
GABUTTI A., «The Italian Excavation in Old Nisa: the Northern Corner of the Round Hall Complex», Mesopotamia XXXI, pp. 161–177, 1996
Invernizzi A., «Archaeological research in Old Nisa 1990–1994», in La Persia e l’Asia Centrale da Alessandro al X secolo, Atti dei Convegni Lincei, 127, Roma, pp. 237–249. 1996
Invernizzi A., «New Archaeological Research in Old Nisa, 1990–1991», in The Art and Archaeology of Ancient Persia. New Light on the Parthian and Sasanian Empire, ed. V. Sarkhosh Curtis, R. Hillenbrand, J.M. Rogers, London-New York, 8–13. 1998
Invernizzi A., «Old Nisa and the Art of the Steppes», Bulletin of the Asia Institute, 10, 33–38. 1998
Invernizzi A., «Parthian Nisa. New Lines of Research», in J. Wiesehöfer (ed.), Das Partherreich und seine Zeugnisse, Beiträge des internationalen Colloquiums – Eutin, 1996, (Historia Einzelschriften, 122), Stuttgart, 45–59. 1998
Invernizzi A., «The Square House at Old Nisa», Parthica 2, pp. 13–53. 2000
Invernizzi A., «Arsacid Dynastic Art», Parthica 3, pp. 133–157. 2001
Invernizzi A., «Arsacid Palaces», in The Royal Palace Institution in the 1st Millennium BC (Ed. I. Nielsen), Athens, pp. 295–312. 2001
LIPPOLIS C., book review of V.N. PILIPKO, Staraja Nisa. Zdanie s Kvadratnym Zalom, Moskva, 1996, su Parthica, 3, 2001, 2001pp. 221–234. 2001
 KOSHELENKO G, LAPCHIN A., «Ricerche nel complesso del Tempio Rotondo a Nisa Vecchia», Parthica 4, pp. 9–45. 2002
 LIPPOLIS C., «Novije Issledovanija Staroj Nisji», Kulturnye Ziennosti 2000–2001, Ashkhabad. 2003
 LIPPOLIS C., «Nisa-Mithradatkert: the building to the north of the Round Hall. Preliminary Report of the 2000–2001 excavations campaign», Central Asia Cultural Values, vol. I, n. 2, June 2003, p. 1–17. 2003
LIPPOLIS C., book review of PILIPKO V.N., Staraja Nisa – Osnovnye itogi arheologicheskogo izuchenija v sovetskij period, su Parthica 5, 2003, p. 3–13. 2003
 Invernizzi A., «The culture of Nisa, between steppe and empire», After Alexander-Central Asia before Islam. Themes in the history and archaeology of Western Central Asia, British Academy Conference, 23–25 June 2004.
Invernizzi A., «Thoughts on Parthian Nisa», in Parthica 6, pp. 133–143. 2004
Invernizzi A., «Representations of Gods in Parthian Nisa», Parthica 7 (2005), pp. 71–80. 2005

External links

 Annotated Parthia Bibliography
 Archaeological Missions in Nisa
 Nissa Fortress, Ayan Tourism & Travel Company
 Historical site Nisa, State Committee of Turkmenistan for Tourism and Sport
 Location of Ancient Nisa on OpenStreetMap
 Recent conservation work on murals from the city (in Russian)

Archaeological sites in Turkmenistan
Parthian cities
World Heritage Sites in Turkmenistan
Former populated places in Turkmenistan
Nishapur Quarter
Ahal Region
Parthian architecture